Hypo Niederösterreich (Hypo NÖ) is an Austrian women's handball club, headquartered in Maria Enzersdorf. They are one of the most successful teams on the EHF Champions League, having won the title eight times. They are also former winners of the EHF Champions Trophy in 2000.

Between 2011 and 2014, Hypo NÖ had a partnership with the Brazilian Handball Confederation, playing host to various players of the Brazil women's national handball team - including Alexandra Nascimento, who already played for Hypo since 2003 - and coach Morten Soubak. During the period, Brazil won the 2013 World Women's Handball Championship with six Hypo Nö players in its roster. Hypo Nö also won the EHF Women's Cup Winners' Cup that year.

Honours
Women Handball Austria:
Winners (44): 1977, 1978, 1979, 1980, 1981, 1982, 1983, 1984, 1985, 1986, 1987, 1988, 1989, 1990, 1991, 1992, 1993, 1994, 1995, 1996, 1997, 1998, 1999, 2000, 2001, 2002, 2003, 2004, 2005, 2006, 2007, 2008, 2009, 2010, 2011, 2012, 2013, 2014, 2015, 2016, 2017, 2018, 2021, 2022
ÖHB Cup:
Winners (29): 1990, 1991, 1992, 1993, 1994, 1995, 1996, 1997, 1998, 1999, 2000, 2001, 2002, 2003, 2004, 2005, 2006, 2007, 2008, 2009, 2010, 2011, 2012, 2013, 2014, 2015, 2016, 2019, 2021
EHF Champions League:
Winners (8): 1989, 1990, 1992, 1993, 1994, 1995, 1998, 2000
Runners-Up (5): 1987, 1988, 1991, 1996, 2008
EHF Champions Trophy:
Winners (1): 2000
Runners-Up (2): 2004, 2008
EHF Cup Winners' Cup:
Winners (1): 2013
Runners-Up (1): 2004

Team

Current squad 
Squad for the 2022–23 season

Goalkeepers
 30  Lea Krenn
 33  Stephanie Reichl
 27  Petra Blazek
  Kerstin Sander
Wingers
RW
 15  Claudia Wess
 5  Kathrin Betz
LW
 6  Mirela Dedic
 17  Johanna Bauer
 89  Eleonora Stankovic
Line players
 8  Sarah Draguljic
 22  Mona Magloth
 94  Jovana Stojanović
 3  Nora Leitner

Back players
LB
 48  Nina Neidhart
 16  Johanna Failmayer
CB
 9  Johanna Schindler
 46  Zeliha Puls
 64  Lilly Fehringer
RB
 13  Sabrina Hödl
 20  Yvonne Riesenhuber

Technical staff
 Head Coach: Ferenc Kovács
 Assistant Coach: Martin Matuschkowitz
 Physiotherapist: SVEN KÖHLER
 Physiotherapist: Dr. Olaf Sonntag

Selected former players

  Belina Lariça
   Jasna Kolar-Merdan
    Ausra Fridrikas
   Tanja Logwin
   Nataliya Rusnachenko
   Liliana Topea
   Simona Spiridon
   Gabriela Rotiș
   Edith Matei
   Sorina Teodorovic
   Gorica Aćimović
  Katrin Engel
  Petra Blazek
  Iris Morhammer
   Rima Sypkus
  Barbara Strass
   Tatyana Dzhandzhgava
   Stanka Božović
  Alla Matushkowitz
  Daniela Piedade
  Barbara Arenhart
  Francine Moraes
  Fernanda da Silva
  Francielle da Rocha
  Ana Paula Rodrigues
  Deonise Cavaleiro
  Idalina Mesquita
  Alexandra Nascimento
  Fabiana Diniz
  Mariana Costa 
  Silvia Pinheiro 
  Yu Geli 
   Anđa Bilobrk 
  
  Marion Limal
  Audrey Bruneau
  Sabine Englert
  Beatrix Balogh
  Erika Kirsner
  Dóra Lőwy
  Helga Németh
  Rita Deli
  Bernadett Temes
  Viktória Soós
  Nikolett Brigovácz
  Marianna Nagy
  Tímea Tóth
  Vivien Léránt
  Ibolya Mehlmann
  Oh Seong-Ok
  Kim Cha-Youn
  Sun Hee-Han
  Myoung Bok-Hee
  Huh Soon-Young
  Park Chung-Hee
  Sonata Vijunaite
  Ruta Latakaite
  Vilma Gainskyte
  
  Terese Pedersen
  Paula Ungureanu
  Alina Marin
  Katarina Tomašević
  Marianna Gubová
  Zuzana Koniková
  Katja Kurent Tatarovac
  Mia Hermansson Högdahl
  Olga Sanko
  Elena Chatalova
  Oxana Pal
  Tetyana Shynkarenko
  Oksana Sakada
  Mariya Boklashchuk
  Svetlana Morozova
  Ganna Kryvoruchko
  Leora Jones
   Slađana Dronić
   Dragica Đurić-Krstić

Coaching history
  Gunnar Prokop (2005)
  Senad Jagodic
 László Laurencz (1984–1985)
 Vinko Kandija (1985–1987; 1991–1992; 1999–2001)
 János Csík (1987–1989)
 Ton van Linder (1989–1990)
 Sándor Vass (1990–1991)
 Arne Högdahl (1992–1995)
 Ivica Rimanic (1995–1997)
 Martin Matuschkowitz (1997–1998; 2003–2004; 2009–2011; 2016–2018)
 László Kovács (1998–1999)
 Ján Packa (2001–2002)
 János Gyurka (2002–2003)
 Yuriy Klimov (2004–2005)
 Mile Isaković (2005)
 Ryan Zinglersen (2005–2007)
  András Németh (2007–2009, 2011–2013)
 Christian Maly (2009)
  Morten Soubak (2013–2014)
 Ferenc Kovács (2009, 2014–2016; 2018–)

References

External links
 

Austrian handball clubs
Handball clubs established in 1972